Alabama increased from one to three seats in reapportionment following the 1820 United States Census.  The state then changed from a single at-large district to three geographic districts.

See also 
 1822 and 1823 United States House of Representatives elections
 List of United States representatives from Alabama

1823
Alabama
United States House of Representatives